The Canso Canal Bridge is a rotating swing bridge in Nova Scotia, Canada. It crosses the Canso Canal at the eastern end of the Canso Causeway, connecting the Nova Scotia peninsula to Cape Breton Island. The bridge carries the 2 traffic lanes of Highway 104 (the Trans-Canada Highway) as well as a single track railway line operated by the Cape Breton and Central Nova Scotia Railway (CBNS).

The bridge is owned and maintained by the railway company, although maintenance costs are shared by the Government of Nova Scotia's Department of Transportation and Infrastructure Renewal.

Dimensions

History
The bridge carried its first traffic (a train) on April 18, 1955 when the Canso Causeway construction was completed.  Its official opening was on August 13 of that year.

From 1955-1993 the bridge was owned and operated by the Canadian National Railway (CN).  Ownership was transferred to the CBNS after that company purchased the Truro-Sydney railway line in 1993.

The railway employs a bridge operator who is required by federal law to rotate the structure to accommodate vessel passage.

References
History of the Canso Canal

Road bridges in Nova Scotia
Road-rail bridges
Swing bridges in Canada
Transport in Inverness County, Nova Scotia
Buildings and structures in Inverness County, Nova Scotia
Bridges completed in 1955
Bridges on the Trans-Canada Highway
Railway bridges in Nova Scotia
1955 establishments in Nova Scotia